Peter Haynes may refer to:

 Peter Haynes (mathematician), British mathematician
 Peter Haynes (priest) (1925–2018), Anglican priest
 Peter Haynes (footballer) (born 1982), Australian association football player